The 2007 EU Cup of Australian rules football was held in Hamburg (Germany) on 15 September 2007, with the attendance of 12 teams. The tournament was won by Sweden defeating Germany in the final.

Teams

Pool matches

Finals

First round

Quarter finals

9th-12th places

5th-8th places

Semifinals

11th-12th places

9th-10th places

7th-8th places

5th-6th places

3rd-4th places

FINAL

Final standings

See also
EU Cup

Notes and references

External links
EU Cup 2007 official website 
Results at The Footy Record

EU Cup
International sports competitions hosted by Germany
Sports competitions in Hamburg
EU Cup
2007 in Australian rules football
2000s in Hamburg
September 2007 sports events in Europe